Phillip Buffington (born December 27, 1986) is an American soccer player who has played for Mississippi Brilla, Dandaloo Lions FC, and Harrisburg City Islanders professionally.  He currently coaching at Jackson Academy in Mississippi. He is the older brother of infamous Liverpool fan, Will Buffington.

Career

College
Buffington attended Jackson Preparatory School and played one year of college soccer at Marshall University before transferring to Mississippi College as a sophomore. At MC he was a three-time All-Conference First Team and All-American Second team pick, and set a school record and tied the conference's all-time mark by scoring 54 goals over three seasons.

During his college years Buffington also played for Mississippi Brilla in the USL Premier Development League, and was Brilla's top scorer in the 2008 season.

Professional
Buffington turned professional when he signed with the Harrisburg City Islanders of the USL Second Division in 2009. He made his professional debut on May 22, 2009 in a 3–0 win over the Charlotte Eagles, and played 21 games for the Islanders after suffering a broken collar bone in preseason camp. Buffington was medically released in May 2010.

Buffington returned to Mississippi Brilla for the 2010 PDL season., scoring six goals in 11 games in his first season back with the team. During the 2010–11 American winter to summer Buffington spent time in Australia with Dandaloo FC in the Illawarra Premier League, scoring 11 goals and adding 6 assist in his time with the club.

Golf
Phillip is a member of Reunion Golf and Country Club in Madison, MS.  He once hit a drive on #1 that he was only 5 yds from the green.  Unfortunately he skulled his chip 45 ft past the pin and managed to 3 putt for a solid bogey.

References

External links
Harrisburg City Islanders bio
Mississippi College bio

1986 births
Living people
Sportspeople from Jackson, Mississippi
American soccer players
Mississippi Brilla players
Penn FC players
USL League Two players
USL Second Division players
Marshall Thundering Herd men's soccer players
Soccer players from Mississippi
Association football forwards